Volunteers for Economic Growth Alliance (VEGA) is an umbrella group consisting of 23 economic development organizations that integrate highly skilled volunteers into programs. VEGA is usually contracted by United States Agency for International Development (USAID) for specific projects that involve one or more of the Member organizations. The organization is headquartered in Washington, DC and its members have offices around the world in developing/transitioning economies where USAID operates.

Member organizations 
These are all typically US-based, economic development NGOs.
ACDI/VOCA
Aid to Artisans / Creative Learning
CNFA
Coffee Quality Institute
CRDF Global
Cuso International
EMDAP IIE/Emerging Markets Development Advisor Program 
FSVC Financial Services Volunteer Corps
FAVACA Florida Association for Volunteer Action in the Caribbean and the Americas
Global Business School Network
ICMA International City/County Management Association 
IESC
IRPF International Real Property Foundation 
ISLP International Senior Lawyers Project 
Land O'Lakes International Development
Mennonite Economic Development Association (MEDA)
National Cooperative Business Association's Cooperative League of the USA International Program (NCBA-CLUSA)
OICI International 
Partners of the Americas
PYXERA Global
SAVE Travel Alliance
Sustainable Travel International
Winrock International

Economic development